North Lebanon Stars is a women's association football club based in Tripoli, Lebanon. Founded in 2019 as Montada North Lebanon, they competed in the Lebanese Women's Football League until the 2020–21 season.

History 
Founded in 2019, Montada North Lebanon finished in 4th place in Group B of the 2019–20, qualifying to the Final Eight round, where they finished in 8th place. On 22 June 2021, the club changed their name to North Lebanon Stars.

See also
 Lebanese Women's Football League
 Women's football in Lebanon
 List of women's association football clubs in Lebanon

References

Women's football clubs in Lebanon
2019 establishments in Lebanon
Association football clubs established in 2019